William Edgar Swinnerton (27 November 1899 – 13 December 1985) was a yachtsman from New Zealand. He competed for New Zealand in the 1956 Summer Olympics in Melbourne, coming 11th in the three-man Dragon class with Albert Cuthbertson and Robert Stewart.

References

Sources
 Black Gold by Ron Palenski (2008, 2004 New Zealand Sports Hall of Fame, Dunedin) p. 87

External links 
 
 

1899 births
1985 deaths
New Zealand male sailors (sport)
Olympic sailors of New Zealand
Sailors at the 1956 Summer Olympics – Dragon